Goebel Township is an inactive township in Oregon County, in the U.S. state of Missouri.

Goebel Township was established in the 1910s, taking its name from William Goebel, 34th Governor of Kentucky.

References

Townships in Missouri
Townships in Oregon County, Missouri